The 1974 Australian Sports Car Championship was a CAMS sanctioned Australian motor racing title open to Group A Sports Cars and Group D Production Sports Cars.  The title, which was the sixth Australian Sports Car Championship, was won by Henry Michell driving an Elfin 360 Repco.

Calendar
The championship was contested over a four-round series with one race per round.

Classes
Cars competed in two engine displacement classes:
 Up to and including 2,500cc
 Over 2,500cc

Points system
Championship points were awarded on a 9-6-4-3-2-1 basis to the first six place-getters in each class.
Additional points were awarded on a 4-3-2-1 basis to the first four place-getters outright, irrespective of class.

Championship results

References

Sports Car Championship
Australian Sports Car Championship